Atapattu Mudiyanselage Chamari Jayangani (born 9 February 1990, also known as Chamari Athapaththu) is a Sri Lankan cricketer and the current captain of the women's Twenty20 International team of Sri Lanka. She had a short stint as the captain of the Sri Lanka women's team, and was succeeded by the previous captain Shashikala Siriwardene. Chamari was the tenth captain for Sri Lanka women's national cricket team, winning only one ODI, with 13 losses. In November 2017, she was named the Women's Cricketer of the Year for the 2016–17 season at Sri Lanka Cricket's annual awards. She is the first Sri Lankan woman to play in  franchise cricket.

International career
She is known for aggressive batting in the top order. In the 2013 Women's Cricket World Cup, Atapattu hit a quick fifty against England women, where the Sri Lanka women won the match by one wicket. Under her captaincy, Sri Lanka women won the T20I series against Pakistan Women.

She is also the only Sri Lankan woman cricketer to score an ODI century, doing this five times in her career. She scored her maiden ODI century on 28 April 2011 against Ireland. She holds the record for scoring the most number of ODI centuries and fifties for Sri Lanka in women's cricket history. She also holds the record for the highest WODI score for Sri Lanka, with 178 not out. She has the highest ODI average for Sri Lanka in women's cricket. She is also the only Sri Lankan woman cricketer to score an ODI hundred as well as having scored most runs in an innings at a strike rate of over 100. She was the third woman cricketer in the world to be dismissed for 99 in an ODI innings.

Atapattu's 178 not out is the highest Women's ODI score when batting at number three position for Sri Lanka. Chamari Atapattu is the first and only Sri Lankan woman cricketer to score a century in Women's Cricket World Cup history

Atapattu is the first Sri Lankan batswoman to pass 1,000 runs in T20Is and she is also the leading runscorer for Sri Lanka in both ODIs and T20Is.

At 2016 ICC Women's T20 World Cup  she scored her maiden T20Is half century against South Africa. During that match, South African's had a successful 50 run partnership for the first wicket. But Atapattu came in charge break the partnership from runout and she bowled Mignon du Preez for a four-ball duck in the same over. Finally, Sri Lanka won the match by 10 runs. For the all round performance Atapattu won player of the match award. She was the leading run scorer for Sri Lanka with 141 runs in four matches.

At the 2017 Women's Cricket World Cup, during Sri Lanka's match against Australia, she scored the third-highest individual total in a WODI and the second-highest total in a Women's World Cup match, with 178 not out. She also scored the highest percentage of runs in a completed innings in a WODI (69.26%) and the most runs in boundaries in a WODI, with 124. It was also the record for scoring the highest individual score in an innings of a WODI in a losing cause. Even in a losing cause she won player of the match award for her performance.

In October 2018, she was named as captain of Sri Lanka's squad for the 2018 ICC Women's World Twenty20 tournament in the West Indies. Ahead of the tournament, she was named as one of the players to watch. She was the leading run-scorer for Sri Lanka in the tournament, with 59 runs in three matches.

On 9 October 2019 third ODI match against Australia Atapattu scored her fifth ODI century. On 29 September 2019, in the first WT20I match against Australia, Atapattu scored her first century in WT20I cricket. She scored 113 runs from 66 balls. Athapaththu went from 51 to 113 in merely 22 deliveries, as she hit 12 fours and six sixes at a strike rate of 171.21 during the innings against Australia but Sri Lanka lost the match.

In January 2020, she was named as the captain of Sri Lanka's squad for the 2020 ICC Women's T20 World Cup in Australia. During practice match against England Atapattu scored unbeaten 78 runs and took three wickets and Sri Lanka won the match. In the first WT20 match against New Zealand She scored 41 runs and took one wicket but Sri Lanka lost the match. Next match against Australia she scored her second T20I half century. She was the leading run-scorer for Sri Lanka in the tournament, with 154 runs in four matches including one half century.

In October 2021, she was named as the captain of Sri Lanka's team for the 2021 Women's Cricket World Cup Qualifier tournament in Zimbabwe. In January 2022, Atapattu was named as the captain of Sri Lanka's team for the 2022 Commonwealth Games Cricket Qualifier tournament in Malaysia. She performed consistently throughout Commonwealth Games Cricket Qualifier scoring 221 runs in four matches  including two half centuries with average of 55.25 and strike rate of 185.71, and also taking four wickets. Due to her all round performance she won player of the series award. Sri Lanka won all four games and secure the place at Commonwealth games 2022. Following her performance at the Commonwealth Games Qualifier, she moved into the top 10 of the ICC Women's T20I batting rankings.

In June 2022, third ODI against Pakistan, Athapattu scored her sixth ODI century, her first against Pakistan. She scored 101 runs from 85 balls, hitting 13 boundaries and one six. She put 152 run partnership with Harshitha Madavi for 3rd wicket. While bowling she took two wickets and one run out. Finally Sri Lanka won the match by 93 runs. Athapattu won player of the match award for her performance. Later the same month, in Sri Lanka's home series against India, Athapattu became the first batter for Sri Lanka to score 2,000 runs in WT20I cricket.

In July 2022, she was named as the captain of Sri Lanka's team for the cricket tournament at the 2022 Commonwealth Games in Birmingham, England.

On 10th February 2023, opener of T20 World cup 2023, Athapattu scored his 6th T20I half century against South Africa. She scored 68 runs from 50 balls hitting 12 boundaries.  Finally Sri Lanka won the match by 3 runs and Athapattu won player of the match award for her performance.

International centuries

Overview
, Athapaththu had scored six ODI centuries, against five different teams, with a top score of 178*. Half of her ODI centuries had been scored in Sri Lanka, and the others in England, Australia and Pakistan, respectively.

Athapaththu was not only the most prolific, but also the only, female Sri Lankan ODI centurion. Additionally, she had scored a WT20I century, the only Sri Lankan woman to have done so.

One Day International centuries

T20 International centuries

Franchise cricket
Atapattu is the first Sri Lankan to play in the Women's BBL franchise. She was signed by Melbourne Renegades for the third edition of the WBBL. In her 16 matches for Melbourne Renegades she has scored 196 runs with a high score of 42 and best bowling figures of 2–6. Before WBBL, her an unbeaten 178 against Australia in Bristol, helped her to become the first Sri Lankan woman to sign a contract with a franchise-based T20 league. She represented Yorkshire Diamonds and Loughborough Lightning in the second edition of the Kia Super League in England in 2017. Atapattu's stand-out season was in 2017 for Yorkshire Diamonds, when she made 135 runs in five matches.

In August 2022, she was signed as an overseas player for Guyana Amazon Warriors for the inaugural edition of the Women's Caribbean Premier League. She returned to Melbourne Renegades during the 2022–23 Women's Big Bash League season, as a replacement for Harmanpreet Kaur.

See also
 List of centuries in women's One Day International cricket

References

External links

 

1990 births
Living people
Asian Games medalists in cricket
Cricketers at the 2014 Asian Games
Asian Games bronze medalists for Sri Lanka
Medalists at the 2014 Asian Games
Sri Lankan women cricketers
Sri Lanka women One Day International cricketers
Sri Lanka women Twenty20 International cricketers
Sri Lanka women cricket captains
Kurunegala Youth Cricket Club women cricketers
Melbourne Renegades (WBBL) cricketers
Yorkshire Diamonds cricketers
Loughborough Lightning cricketers
IPL Supernovas cricketers
Perth Scorchers (WBBL) cricketers
Guyana Amazon Warriors (WCPL) cricketers
Cricketers at the 2022 Commonwealth Games
Commonwealth Games competitors for Sri Lanka